Crocker-McMillin Mansion-Immaculate Conception Seminary is a historic seminary in Mahwah, Bergen County, New Jersey, United States. The Immaculate Conception Seminary was founded in 1861 as part of Seton Hall University. From 1927 to 1984 the seminary was located in the Crocker-McMillin Mansion. It is now again part of Seton Hall University.

It was built in 1903 and added to the National Register of Historic Places in 1997.

See also 
 National Register of Historic Places listings in Bergen County, New Jersey

References

Houses on the National Register of Historic Places in New Jersey
Gothic Revival architecture in New Jersey
Houses completed in 1903
Houses in Bergen County, New Jersey
Mahwah, New Jersey
National Register of Historic Places in Bergen County, New Jersey